The Organization for the Support of Democratic Movement in Taiwan (OSDMT) was a Chinese-American student-led organization which promoted democracy in Taiwan.

History
The Baodiao movement that started in 1972 inspired many Chinese-American students to become politically conscious in Taiwan affairs.

In 1978, a group of University of Chicago Chinese-American students started an effort to stay the execution of the political prisoner .

In 1979 the exiled activist  organized the students into a not-for-profit 501(c)(3) organization with a mission to promote democracy in Taiwan.

OSDMT was dissolved in 1987, after martial law was lifted in Taiwan.

Publication
OSDMT published the free magazine Democratic Taiwan from 1979 to 1987, total 41 issues.

References

 
 
 
 University of Pittsburgh Library System catalog of Democratic Taiwan
 Democratic Taiwan Archives

External links

Defunct organizations based in the United States